Richárd Nagy (born 15 August 1995) is a Hungarian football player who currently plays for FC Veszprém on loan from Paksi SE.

Club statistics

Updated to games played as of 19 May 2019.

References 
HLSZ

1995 births
Living people
Footballers from Budapest
Hungarian footballers
Association football forwards
Paksi FC players
SZEOL SC players
Nemzeti Bajnokság I players
Nemzeti Bajnokság II players